Peidong Yang (born 1971) is a Chinese-American chemist, material scientist, and businessman. He is currently a professor at the University of California, Berkeley (since 1999) and a member of the American Academy of Arts and Sciences. He is a Professor of Chemistry and a Professor of Materials Science. His research group studies the synthesis of nanomaterials and their electronic and optical properties. He is also a Department Head at the Joint Center for Artificial Photosynthesis, Senior Faculty Scientist at Lawrence Berkeley National Laboratory, and Deputy Director of the Center of Integrated Nanomechanical Systems (COINS). He is an associate editor of the Journal of the American Chemical Society, an American Chemical Society Journal.

Biography 
Yang received a B.A. in Chemistry from the University of Science and Technology of China in 1993. For his graduate studies, he worked with Charles M. Lieber at Harvard University, and in 1997, he was awarded a Ph.D. in Chemistry. He was a post-doctoral fellow with Galen D. Stucky at University of California, Santa Barbara from 1997–1999, until being hired as an assistant professor in Chemistry at University of California, Berkeley, where he was granted tenure in 2004.

Career 
Yang is well known for his work in nanostructure synthesis and characterization, having co-authored over 200 peer-reviewed journal articles. One of his most notable papers, "Room-Temperature Ultraviolet Nanowire Nanolasers", was published in Science in 2001 and has received over 5000 citations. In 2010, Yang was ranked as the top materials scientist and among the top 10 chemists of the decade 2000-2010 by Thomson Reuters, in order of citation impact. As one of the leaders of the Joint Center for Artificial Photosynthesis, a DOE Energy Innovation Hub awarded in 2010, he is coordinating efforts to develop materials that use sunlight to convert water to fuel. Since coming to Berkeley, Yang has mentored over 30 graduate students and over 30 postdoctoral researchers.

Business ventures 
He was a founding member of the scientific advisory board at Nanosys, a nanomaterials company, and he is also the founder of Alphabet Energy with Matthew L. Scullin. He lives with his wife, Mei, and their daughter, Rachel.

Awards 

 Camille and Henry Dreyfus Foundation New Faculty Award (1999)
 3M Untenured Faculty Award (2000)
 Sloan Fellowship Research Fellowship (2001)
 National Science Foundation CAREER Award (2001)
 Hellman Family Faculty Award (2001)
 ACS ExxonMobil Solid State Chemistry Award (2001)
 Beckman Young Investigators Award (2002)
 MIT Technology Review TR100 (2003), as one of the top 100 innovators in the world under the age of 35.
 ChevronTexaco Chair in Chemistry, Berkeley (2003)
 First Chairperson for American Chemical Society, Nanoscience Subdivision (2003)
 Camille Dreyfus Teacher-Scholar Award (2004)
 Dupont Young Professor Award (2004)
 Julius Springer Prize for Applied Physics (2004)
 Materials Research Society Outstanding Young Investigator Award (2004)
 ACS Award in Pure Chemistry (2005)
 University of Wisconsin McElvain Lectureship (2006)
 Chinese Academy of Science Molecular Science Forum Lectureship (2006)
 National Science Foundation A. T. Waterman Award (2007)
 Scientific American 50 Award (2008)
 Miller Research Professorship (2008)
 Columbia University Brian Bent Lectureship (2009)
 MacArthur Fellow (2015) 
 National Academy of Sciences (2016)
 Global Energy Prize (2020)

References

External links 
Executive profile at Bloomberg Businessweek

1971 births
21st-century American businesspeople
21st-century American chemists
American chemical industry businesspeople
American energy industry businesspeople
American technology chief executives
American technology company founders
Businesspeople from Suzhou
Chemists from Jiangsu
Chinese emigrants to the United States
Educators from Suzhou
Fellows of the American Academy of Arts and Sciences
Harvard Graduate School of Arts and Sciences alumni
Lawrence Berkeley National Laboratory people
Living people
MacArthur Fellows
Members of the United States National Academy of Sciences
Scientists from Suzhou
UC Berkeley College of Chemistry faculty
University of Science and Technology of China alumni